Punjabi Sikhs are adherents of Sikhism who identify linguistically, culturally, and genealogically as Punjabis and are native of Undivided Punjab region of Indian Subcontinent. Sikhism is an Indigenous religion born and brought up in Punjab region of South Asia during 15th century. Almost 96% of world's Sikh population are Punjabis.

While Punjabi Sikhs are mostly found in the Indian state of Punjab today, many have ancestry from the greater Punjab region, an area that was partitioned between India and Pakistan in 1947. In the contemporary era, Punjab Sikhs are found in large numbers across the Indian states of Punjab, Haryana, Himachal Pradesh, Uttarakhand, Delhi, Chandigarh, Rajasthan and Maharashtra. Large numbers are also found in the United States, Canada, Australia, New Zealand and Britain, as various immigration waves over the centuries better prospects and career.

History

The origins of the Sikhs, a religious group initially formed as a sect within the larger Punjabi Hindu community in Undivided Punjab region during 15th century. The Sikh religion founder, Shri Guru Nanak Dev ji (1469–1539), was roughly a contemporary of the founder of Mughal fortunes in India, Bābur. Guru Nanak dev ji was born in a Punjabi Hindu Khatri family, which was initially a community of scribes and traders. In Un-divided Punjab region, the eldest son of every Punjabi Hindu families was nominated and was represented as Sardars and had protected their family and Indic communities from the tyrannies of Mughal rulers and their torture. A huge number of peasants from Hindu and Muslim in Punjab have converted to Sikhism for various motives since the starting of new faith.

Language 
Punjabi Sikhs speaks the Punjabi language as their mother tongue. Various dialects of Punjabi language such as Bagri, Bilaspuri, Bhateali, Majhi, Doabi, Malwai, and Puadhi etc are spoken by Punjabi Sikhs across India and abroad as their mother tongue. In Indian Punjab, Punjabi is written in Gurmukhi script, While in Pakistan's Punjab, Shahmukhi script is used respectively. Gurmukhi is written from left to right, while Shahmukhi is written from right to left. The use of Gurmukhi script generally started and developed during the time of 2nd Sikh guru, Guru Angad Dev (1504–1552) who have standardized it. It is commonly regarded as Sikh Script. While Shahmukhi script have been used by Punjabi Muslims since from the time of 12th century, when Punjabi Sufi Poets have used it to write Punjabi. Shahmukhi is a Perso-Arabic alphabet script.

Notes

References

Further reading
 Benson, Heather Lené. "In Place/Out of Place: Punjabi-Sikhs in Reno, Nevada" (PhD dissertation, University of Nevada, Reno, 2022) online.
 Bhachu, Parminder. "Culture, ethnicity and class among Punjabi Sikh women in 1990s Britain." Journal of Ethnic and Migration Studies 17.3 (1991): 401-412.

 Banerjee, Himadri. "The Other Sikhs: Punjabi-Sikhs of Kolkata." Studies in History 28.2 (2012): 271-300.

 Grewal, Jagtar Singh. The Sikhs of the Punjab (Cambridge University Press, 1998).

 Usha, George, and Ferzana Chaze. "Punjabis/Sikhs in Canada." in Mobility and Multiple Affiliations (2016): 91-104.

Community
Sikhs
Punjabi people
Punjabi tribes
Sikh culture
Sikhism